The subdivisions of Sierra Leone are as follows:
First level
 4 provinces
 1 area
Second level
 16 districts
Third level
 186 chiefdoms

Provinces 

Sierra Leone is divided into 4 provinces and a Western Area for the capital Freetown.

Eastern Province
Northern Province
North West Province
Southern Province
Western Area

Districts 

The provinces of Sierra Leone are divided into 16 districts. 14 are rural, with the capital Freetown divided into 2 districts. One traditional leader from each district occupies a seat in Sierra Leone's parliament.

Chiefdoms 

Sierra Leone is further divided into 149 chiefdoms. The chiefdoms are hereditary, tribal units of local governance. The World Bank sponsored the creation of elected local councils in 2004.

Chiefs have the power to "raise taxes, control the judicial system, and allocate land, the most important resource in rural areas."

See also 
 Geography of Sierra Leone

References 

 
Sierra Leone